Hartwell & Swasey was a short-lived 19th-century architectural firm in Boston, Massachusetts.  The partnership between Henry Walker Hartwell (1833-1919) and Albert E. Swasey, Jr. lasted from the late-1860s to 1877, when Swasey went on his own. In 1881, Hartwell formed a partnership with William Cummings Richardson – Hartwell and Richardson – that lasted until his death. 

Several of Hartwell & Swasey's buildings were designed in Ruskinian Gothic Revival style, featuring polychrome brick and carved stone details.  A number of the firm's works are listed on the U.S. National Register of Historic Places.

Selected works
Central Fire Station (1869), Leonard and School Sts. Taunton, Massachusetts (Swasey, A. E., Jr.), NRHP-listed
Central Congregational Church, (1871), 100 Rock Street, Fall River, Massachusetts (Hartwell & Swasey), NRHP-listed
Dr. Harrison A. Tucker Cottage (1872), 42 Ocean Ave. Oak Bluffs, Massachusetts (Hartwell & Swasey), NRHP-listed
Anawan No. 6 Firehouse (1873), North Main Street, Fall River, Massachusetts, NRHP-listed, as part of the Highlands Historic District
Massasoit Fire House No. 5 (1873), 83 Freedom Street, Fall River, Massachusetts (Hartwell & Swasey), NRHP-listed
Pocasset Firehouse No. 7 (1873), 1058 Pleasant Street, Fall River, Massachusetts (Hartwell & Swasey), NRHP-listed
Quequechan Firehouse (1873), 330 Prospect Street, Fall River, Massachusetts, NRHP-listed, as part of the Highlands Historic District
William C. Davol Jr. House (1876), 252 High Street, Fall River, Massachusetts (Hartwell & Swasey), NRHP-listed
Academy Building (1876), also known as the Borden Block, on S. Main Street, Fall River, Massachusetts (Hartwell & Swasey), NRHP-listed
Simeon Borden Mansion (1876), 484 Highland Avenue, Fall River, Massachusetts, NRHP-listed, as part of the Highlands Historic District

References

Architecture firms based in Massachusetts